The Hedberg Public Library is a public library located in Janesville, Wisconsin. The library is a member of the Arrowhead Library System.

History
The library's origins date back to 1865, when it was a privately supported reading room for The Young Men's Association. It became the Janesville Public Library after a referendum passed in 1884 and was housed in a building known as "Bennett's Block." The library rented the space, which was near the present intersection of West Milwaukee and River streets. A building next door to "Bennett's Block" was leased three years later.

The library's first permanent home was built in 1902 at 64 S. Main. Key financial support came from the Andrew Carnegie foundation and the estate of F. S. Eldred of Janesville. General contractor J. P. Cullen and Brother of Janesville was paid $35,000 to construct the library, which opened in 1903. This building was remodeled in 1927 and again in 1932.

When the library outgrew its quarters in the early 1960s, a new library was built at 316 S. Main Street, where the library moved in April 1968. The new building's cost was $939,000. Funding included a $142,000 federal grant and a $780,000 city bond issue. Frelich-Angus Associates and Severson-Schlintz, both of Janesville, were selected as architect and general contractor, respectively.

The new  building reached its intended capacity by 1979, but further expansion would wait until 1993, when a $3 million gift from Don and Gerry Hedberg put the topic back on the table. The expansion would eventually cost $8 million, including furnishings and automation. The Hedbergs, former owners of Lab Safety Supply in Janesville, increased their donation to $4.66 million. Other funders were city taxpayers ($1.49 million), the library's capital campaign ($1.1 million), the Grainger and Janesville Foundations ($625,000) and the Friends of Janesville Public Library ($25,000).

In May 1994, library operations moved to temporary quarters in a former K-mart store (now the Rock County Job Center) on the city's south side when expansion began. To save money, the original elevator shaft, the lower level and some structural elements remained intact, but the look was all new. The library reopened on Main Street in June 1996.

With the expansion, the Janesville Public Library was renamed Hedberg Public Library in honor of primary donors Don and Gerry Hedberg.

Architect: Meyer, Scherer and Rockcastle, Minneapolis, MN
General Contractor: Miron Construction, Menasha
Present square footage: 63,000

References

Incorporates text from "A Brief History of Hedberg Public Library". Hedberg Public Library. Used with permission.

Library buildings completed in 1968
Government buildings completed in 1968
Buildings and structures in Janesville, Wisconsin
Education in Rock County, Wisconsin
Public libraries in Wisconsin